The Chamberlin trimetric projection is a map projection where three points are fixed on the globe and the points on the sphere are mapped onto a plane by triangulation. It was developed in 1946 by Wellman Chamberlin for the National Geographic Society.
Chamberlin was chief cartographer for the Society from 1964 to 1971.
The projection's principal feature is that it compromises between distortions of area, direction, and distance. A Chamberlin trimetric map therefore gives an excellent overall sense of the region being mapped.
Many National Geographic Society maps of single continents use this projection.

As originally implemented, the projection algorithm begins with the selection of three points near the outer boundary of the area to be mapped. From these three base points, the true distances to a point on the mapping area are calculated. The distances from each of the three base points are then drawn on the plane by compass circles. Unlike triangulation on a plane where three such compass circles will intersect at a unique point, the compass circles from a sphere do not intersect precisely at a point. A small triangle is generated from the intersections, and the center of this triangle is calculated as the mapped point.

A Chamberlin trimetric projection map was originally obtained by graphically mapping points at regular intervals of latitude and longitude, with shorelines and other features then mapped by interpolation. Based on the principles of the projection, precise, but lengthy, mathematical formulas were later developed for calculating this projection by computer for a spherical earth.

The Chamberlin trimetric projection is neither conformal nor equal-area. Rather, the projection was conceived to minimize distortion of distances everywhere with the side-effect of balancing between areal equivalence and conformality. This projection is not appropriate for mapping the entire sphere because the outer boundary would loop and overlap itself in most configurations.

In some cases, the Chamberlin trimetric projection is difficult to distinguish visually from the Lambert azimuthal equal-area projection centered on the same area.

See also
 Two-point equidistant projection

References

External links
 The Chamberlin Trimetric Projection - Implementations of the projection using Matlab scripts.
 The Chamberlin Trimetric Projection - Notes on the projection from a cartography class at Colorado State University.

Map projections